American Murderer is an American true crime drama film, written and directed by Matthew Gentile in his feature directorial debut. It stars Tom Pelphrey, Idina Menzel, Ryan Philippe, Jacki Weaver, Paul Schneider, Shantel VanSanten, Kevin Corrigan and Moisés Arias. The film tells the story of Jason Derek Brown and premiered on June 27, 2022 at the Taormina Film Fest in Sicily.

Cast
 Tom Pelphrey as Jason Derek Brown
 Idina Menzel as Melanie
 Ryan Philippe as Lance Leising
 Jacki Weaver as Jeanne
 Shantel VanSanten as Jamie Brown
 Paul Schneider as David Brown
 Kevin Corrigan as David Brown Sr.
 Moisés Arias as Kyle Wallace
 Emelina Adams as Michelle

Production
Writer/Director Matthew Gentile had first learned about Jason Derek Brown when he was about fourteen years old: "Before I wanted to be a filmmaker, I wanted to be an FBI agent. I had heard about Jason's case because I used to go on the FBI website and I would look at the top 10 fugitives. Jason's face stuck out because on the Top 10 list you have menacing faces, Whitey Bulger, Osama Bin Laden, and then this surfer dude from Southern California. I was immediately interested in the story." 

After graduating film school at the American Film Institute over a decade later, Gentile learned Brown was still missing and became inspired to tell this story as his first feature film. Inspired by dark, gritty character studies such as Star 80, The Honeymoon Killers, and Vengeance is Mine, Gentile wrote the screenplay on spec. 

In 2018, he completed a proof of concept short film with Jonathan Groff in the main role and Amanda Crew which served as a calling card for the screenplay that was sold to Traveling Picture Show Company and GiGi Films. 

In December 2020, it was announced Tom Pelphrey, Idina Menzel, Ryan Philippe, Jacki Weaver, Paul Schneider, Shantel VanSanten, Kevin Corrigan and Moisés Arias had joined the cast of the film.

Principal photography was completed on a tight schedule (22 days) at the height of the pandemic, in November/December 2020, with pick-ups and second unit photography done in early 2021.

Release
American Murderer had its world premiere on June 27, 2022 at the Taormina Film Fest in Sicily.

After early screenings at multiple festivals including Newport Beach, Boston, Fayetteville, and Buffalo -- the film won the Artistic Director's Award at the San Diego International Film Festival in October 2022, Best Narrative Feature at Fayetteville Film Fest, and Best Actor (Tom Pelphrey) and Best Music (Scott Gentile) at the Boston Film Festival.

On July 19, 2022, it was announced in Variety that Saban Films bought the rights to distribute American Murderer in the United States and Canada. It had a limited theatrical release on October 21, 2022 before coming out on digital/demand on October 28, 2022.

American Murderer was released internationally by Universal Pictures on January 30th, 2023.

Reception
On review aggregator website Rotten Tomatoes, the film holds an approval rating of 76% based on 41 reviews, with an average score of 6/10 and an audience approval rating of 94%. Critics generally praised the performance of Tom Pelphrey, as well as Gentile's direction in his debut, the cinematography, and score. 

After the international release through Universal Pictures, American Murderer became a top 10 hit on streaming platforms iTunes, Google, and Rakuten TV in over 20 countries including Italy, Spain, Brazil, Germany, Austria, and Switzerland.

In an article for We Got This Covered, Scott Campbell analyzed how American Murderer became a sleeper hit on VOD.

References

External links
 
 

2022 films
2022 directorial debut films
2022 drama films
American docudrama films
American films based on actual events
American thriller films
Hood films
Films about assassinations
True crime
2020s English-language films
2020s American films
2020s biographical drama films